Çuxurazəmi (also, Çuxrəzəmi, Çuxurəzəmi, Chukhurazami, and Chukhur-Zami) is a village and municipality in the Davachi Rayon of Azerbaijan.  It has a population of 287.  The municipality consists of the villages of Çuxurəzəmi, Qızılqazma, Qəriblik, Dəhnə, Covrurah, and Zöhrabkənd.

References 

Populated places in Shabran District